The 1976 Maine Black Bears football team was an American football team that represented the University of Maine as a member of the Yankee Conference during the 1976 NCAA Division II football season. In its first season under head coach Jack Bicknell, the team compiled a 6–5 record (2–3 against conference opponents) and finished in a four-way tie for last place in the Yankee Conference. Scott E. Shulman, Jack Leggett, and Gerard Tautkus were the team captains.

Schedule

References

Maine
Maine Black Bears football seasons
Maine Black Bears football